Biku is a village in Nardiganj Block in Nawada district in the state of Bihar, India. Its PIN code is 805109. The local language is Maithili. As of the 2011 census,  the total population is 2554.

References

Villages in Nawada district